Itzam Cano (born in Mexico City, Mexico) is a Mexican jazz double bassist.

He studied ethnomusicology at the Escuela Nacional de Música from the Universidad Nacional Autónoma de México (UNAM). He studied electric bass and contrabass and the development of improvisation, jazz theory, and harmony.

In late 2005, he joined free jazz ensemble Zero Point. In September 2006, Zero Point participated in the Japanese New Music Festival (Tatsuya Yoshida, Makoto Kawabata y Atsushi Tsuyama), at Multiforo Alicia in Mexico City. By 2007, Zero Point released its first digital album for Ayler Records.

He has worked with Elliot Levin, Marco Eneidi, Dennis, Stefan y Aarón Gonzales, Dave Dove, Shelley Hirsch, Scott Forrey, Milo Tamez, Tom Corona, Lawrence Williams, and Generación Espontánea.

Since 2004 he has performed at the Ollin Jazz Tlalpan Internacional, Festival de Improvisación Libre, Free Jazz y Noise "Cha'ak'ab Paaxil" (with sede in Mérida, Yucatán), Festival Internacional de las Americas in La Habana, Cúba and in festivals in cities like Puebla, Guadalajara, and Zacatecas.

He has been a member of the bands Antimateria, Zero Point, Claude Lawrence trío and has been part of the Orquesta Sinfónica de Puebla and the Orquesta de Percutoris from the Escuela Nacional de Música at the Universidad Nacional Autónoma de México (ENM-UNAM).

Selected ensembles
 Antimateria
 Claude Lawrence Trío
 Zero Point

Major collaborators
 Remi Álvarez
 Gabriel Lauber
 Germán Bringas
 Claude Lawrence

External links
 Antimateria Official site 
 Article of September 18th, 2007 in Mexican newspaper El Reforma 
 Article of October 8th, 2007 at Mexican newspaper El Reforma
 Article of September 26th, 2005 in Mexican newspaper La Jornada
 Article of November 3rd, 2007 at All About Jazz
 Zero Point at Ayler Records

Year of birth missing (living people)
Living people
Mexican jazz musicians
Jazz double-bassists
Musicians from Mexico City
21st-century double-bassists